Lauréat Maltais (30 June 1923 – 1979) was a Social Credit party member of the House of Commons of Canada. He was born in Bergeronnes, Quebec and became a manager by career.

He was first elected at the Saguenay riding in the 1962 general election. After serving his only term, the 25th Canadian Parliament, Maltais was defeated in the 1963 federal election by Gustave Blouin of the Liberal party.

External links
 

1923 births
1979 deaths
Members of the House of Commons of Canada from Quebec
Social Credit Party of Canada MPs